Katharine Smith Reynolds (November 17, 1880 – May 23, 1924), later Katharine Smith Johnston, was the wife of tobacco tycoon R. J. Reynolds and a philanthropist who designed the Reynolda House estate.

Early life 
Katharine Smith was born in Mount Airy, North Carolina. Katharine was the oldest of six children of a prosperous local businessman, Zachary T. Smith and his wife, Mary Susan Jackson. Katharine was well educated and attended the State Normal and Industrial School, now known as the University of North Carolina at Greensboro, in the fall of 1897. After a typhoid epidemic broke out 1899, Katharine transferred to Sullins College in Bristol, Virginia where she graduated in 1902. After returning home from graduation, Katharine worked for R. J. Reynolds, her first cousin once removed, as a secretary at The R.J. Reynolds Tobacco Company in Winston-Salem, North Carolina. The two eventually married in 1905. After an early 8 a.m. ceremony, the couple left for a lavish four-month honeymoon across Europe. The couple then moved in R.J's Queen Anne-style mansion located at 666 Fifth St in Winston-Salem, site of the present-day Forsyth County Public Library.

Reynolda House 
Reynolda House, located in Winston-Salem, North Carolina, was the home of Katharine and R.J. Reynolds. Involved in both the design and construction, Katharine envisioned a progressive, self sustaining country farm and estate built upon the selected 1,000 acre land outside of Winston-Salem. Katharine hired landscape engineers Buckenham and Miller to draw up the master plan, renowned architect Charles Barton Keen of Philadelphia to design the central house or bungalow, and Thomas Sears to plan the gardens. Construction took eight years and when the Reynolds family moved in December 1917, Reynolda was home to a farm complete with the latest in technology and agricultural practices, a dairy, recreational facilities, and a school. After Katharine died in 1924, the estate was held in trust until 1934 when Katharine and R.J's daughter Mary and Mary's husband Charles Babcock Sr acquired Reynolda House. They worked to modernize the estate and eventually donated much of the land for an art museum opened in 1967.

Philanthropy 
As a woman of privilege and wealth, she sought social progress and progressive reform, as evidenced in her push for reforms in the tobacco factory. These included amenities such as hot lunches and water fountains to a nursery for working women. In addition, she was an active member of the Young Women's Christian Association (YWCA) which provided educational and recreational opportunities for young working women, and served as President of the local Winston-Salem chapter in 1917. During World War I, through the R.J Reynolds tobacco company,  she made monetary contributions to the Red Cross to aid in shelter,food, and supplies overseas as well as formed a local chapter with several other prominent women. She was also active in the American Fund for the French Wounded, donating supplies and money and reviewing monthly reports and balance sheets for the organization as well as  the Woman's Committee, serving as state chairman for a sub-organization of this war time committee. Outside of her extensive organizational donations, she donated to many religious causes, helping build churches and supporting missionary activities and programs.

In memory of her first husband she donated funds and land for the creation of the R.J. Reynolds High School. A lavish music festival was held through May 8–11 for the dedication of the Memorial Auditorium, just weeks before Katharine would pass away. A souvenir program for the events says: "In 1919, the City of Winston-Salem, in the course of its ex-tended school building program, planned a model high school, and wished to honor the memory of Richard J. Reynolds, by naming it 'The Richard J. Reynolds High School.' It seemed to his wife, now Mrs. J. Edward Johnston, that a memorial of this kind was very fitting, as Mr. Reynolds had had such a large part and was so interested in the development of this city. Mrs. Johnston had wanted to erect some really worth while memorial personally, and when notified of the action of the city authorities, it seemed that this plant, which would be so closely identified with the life of the people, young and old, presented the opportunity for which she was looking. She therefore notified the city that she would be glad to give a suitable site upon which to erect the high school, the selection to be left to the City, and to present as a personal memorial, a beautiful auditorium in connection with the high school plant." After her death, a public memorial service was held in the same auditorium.

Personal life 
Katharine was married to tobacco tycoon R.J Reynolds from 1905 to 1918. The two had four children together: Richard Joshua Reynolds Jr. (April 4, 1906 - December 14, 1964), Mary Katharine Reynolds (August 8, 1908 - July 17, 1953), Nancy Susan Reynolds (February 5, 1910 - January 1985) and Zachary Smith Reynolds (November 5, 1911 - July 6, 1932). Katharine struggled with heart problems throughout her life, possibly due to an undiagnosed rheumatic fever. As a result, her pregnancies were dangerous. For the birth of Nancy a trained nurse was hired on to care for Katharine and the baby. Nancy would remember later in her life that "Mother liked her so much, and we all got along so well, that she stayed on [after the birth]. She was a graduate nurse. We called her by the nickname “Bum.” Her name was Henriette van den Berg, and I suppose Bum is about as close to van den Berg as children can get...She was a very important member of our household…. Oh, she bossed my mother. She called Mother ‘Dearie.’ But Mother was pretty strong, indeed, and I think a little jealous of Bum sometimes, because she did have so much influence over us. But Mother had so much to do that she couldn’t have done it alone, it was really too much for her.”

After the birth of Nancy in 1910, she was advised by her doctors to not have anymore children. Zachary Smith was born a year later, and she was warned another pregnancy would likely kill her. In early 1914 she suffered a heart attack due to becoming pregnant again, and was rushed to Johns Hopkins Hospital in Baltimore. Due to the risk that continuing the pregnancy would end her life, the decision was made to terminate.

In early 1917, R.J. was ill and increasingly in pain with what was most likely pancreatic cancer. In a letter to a friend around this time, Katharine reported that “His trouble seems to have started [in the summer] with gastritis which went into a small stomach ulceration which healed very quickly, but left him in a rundown, nervous condition.” As his illness became more severe, he had traveled between treatment centers and hospitals with lack of success. He spent Fall of 1917 at Johns Hopkins Hospital. While originally allowed access to her husband, his doctors eventually prohibited all visitors, on grounds that his worry over business matters was worsening his condition. His doctor Thomas R. Brown, in a letter to Katharine, stated that her "great knowledge of his business... could not fail to keep his mind more or less active along business channels," and recommended to only write him "short, very cheerful letters, without any reference to his business affairs.”

Reynolds held misgivings at the decision, and eventually became isolated from her husband and the care he was receiving. A letter during the spouse's separation reads: "“I am wondering if this strange separation from one who loves you better than all others in the world is doing you good? I trust that it is, for your health comes above everything else, but I cannot tell just how you are getting on from Miss Taliaferro’s letters. I would think from their cheery note you were about well. You will never know how terribly I miss you and love you and want your arms again around me and the children.” At this same time, she wrote his nurse Ella Taliaferro: “This has been the most awful trial I’ve ever been through in my life – if you would only tell me something real of Mr. Reynolds – how much he weighs, what he has gained, how many hours he sleeps out of twenty-four, how much he sleeps at night? It would make it a little more bearable. For I am his wife and I love him above all else in the world and I am not in isolation or having a rest cure and not likely to, if it keeps me away from all I hold dear…. Of course, I know you are doing everything you can for him and that he is in the best of hands; but in the lonely, dark hours of the night when sleep will not come, only seeing him would convince me that he is all right…. Now please send me a telegram at my expense and tell me just how Mr. Reynolds is. I wonder if you realize, my dear, how little real information you give me.”

By winter of 1917, R.J. felt better enough to return to Winston-Salem. The Reynolda House construction had been completed and the family officially moved in for Christmas of 1917. However, in early 1918 he was again in much pain and bedridden. While at Reynolda, the room created to be his study was converted into a sick room; In July 1918, he underwent a major surgery and was brought home by private railway car. Nine days later, on July 29, 1918, Reynolds passed away. Due to his popularity in Winston-Salem, banks and City Hall itself were shut down on July 31, the day of his funeral.; the local municipal council also passed a resolution asking local businesses to close for three hours in consideration. The Reynolds family and friends were joined in the funerary procession by Reynolda servants, local Masons, a Boy Scout troop, and thousands lining the streets of downtown Winston-Salem.

After R.J.'s death, Katherine dressed in black mourning and, when unable to sleep at night, would go down to Reynolda House's reception hall to play on the house's aeolian organ. A year into the mourning period, she began holding Sunday evening dances for teachers of the newly expanded estate school. She soon began courting the school principal, J. Edward "Ed" Johnston, about thirteen years her junior. Katharine was the most eligible bachelorette in Winston-Salem high-society; the relationship caused much gossip due to the age and class difference. Within Katharine's family, her daughters Mary and Nancy liked Johnston and were apparently pleased with the new relationship. However, her son R.J. Reynolds Jr, known as "Dick," was upset and angered. Nancy recalled in a 1980 interview that "Dick had been very much a trial to mother, he did not like— I think he was jealous...because we two girls found him most attractive, so we were all for it, it was just delightful to have him in the family...But Dick couldn't take any of this, he was very, very upsetting to mother." Prior to telling Dick of her new relationship, in a letter to a friend, Katharine said she was more nervous to tell Dick about Johnston than her own parents. Johnston's increasing time at Reynolda lead Dick to avoid the estate, staying with his uncle William Neal Reynolds or working for the tobacco company, at one time putting in a 45-hour work week; her child's reaction to Johnston deeply saddened Katharine. Describing telling her parents of the relationship, she wrote that “I told them how I’d worked and planned for the happiness of others, but now I was working and planning day and night for my own..."

J. Edward Johnston and Katharine married June 11, 1921 in the Reception Hall of Reynolda House, in front of the inglenook fireplace, in a small ceremony attended by her three youngest children. A weekend of festivities preceded the ceremony, including a concert for over 500 guests. Her daughter Mary, 12 at the time, wrote in her diary after the marriage: “At about 7:15, Mother was married to Mr. Johnston. The affair was very quiet. Smith was ring bearer, and Nancy and myself were flower girls. We are trying to keep it quiet, but about the [whole] town knows it.” Dick refused to attend the service, deeply disturbing his mother.

After a multi-month honeymoon abroad in Europe, the couple settled in a cottage on the Reynolda Estate, leaving the children in the main house under the primary care of their governess Henrietta van den Berg. A letter from van den Berg to Katharine during the honeymoon said that the children were "'so happy in your happiness,'" reassuring her she had Dick in hand, and that Nancy had told her "'I am so happy, it is wonderful to have a Father again.'" Sometime in the early 1920s a portrait of Mr. Johnston by society portraitist Frank Owen Salisbury was painted.

The new Mrs. Johnston soon became pregnant and they, along with Katharine's children Mary, Nancy, and Smith, moved into a New York apartment to have easier access to doctors for the pregnancy. The night of May 1, 1922, a baby girl, Lola Katharine Johnston, was born to the couple, but passed away a day later at 11 o'clock in the morning. Due to her heart problems, Johnston was frequently seeing doctors at this point in her life, and pregnancy was extremely dangerous for her. Before the pregnancy and birth of Lola, Dick had told Edward Johnston of his mother's condition and emphasized that she should not get pregnant. Once, catching his mother and Ed Johnston in an intimate moment, he punched Johnston in the face. However, Katharine was determined to give her new husband a baby, saying she'd do it "even if it killed [her]."

Despite the danger, she became pregnant in late 1923. The Johnstons again moved to New York for better medical access. On May 21, 1924, she gave birth to a son, J. Edward Johnston Jr. However, due to complications of a brain embolism caused by this childbirth, Katharine would pass away three days later at the age of 44 on May 23, 1924.

Legacy
After her death, J. Edward Johnston created a memorial for his late wife—originally located behind one of Katharine's local creations, the Reynolda Presbyterian Church—called the Katharine Johnston Memorial Circle. Johnston intended for Katharine, and himself eventually, to be interred at the site; however, her son Dick insisted her grave remain at Salem Cemetery where she was buried beside her first husband. The principle piece of the memorial, an obelisk made of Mt. Airy granite, presently resides in front of R.J. Reynolds High School, next to Hawthorne Rd. At the base of the monument is a statement of contemporary pastor Rev. Lilly: KATHARINE SMITH JOHNSTON. To her was given the vision of life in its larger meaning; She wrought with understanding heart for a greater future for mankind; All that love and labor for this cause rise up and call her blessed; ANNO DOMINI MCMXXIV."

An honors scholarship and a dormitory exists in her name at the University of North Carolina at Greensboro. Known as the Katharine Smith Reynolds Scholarship, it grants honor student recipients funding for community service involvement as well as internship and study abroad programs and opportunities.

In 2016, the Kimpton Hotel in Winston-Salem, North Carolina opened a restaurant named after Katharine called The Katharine Brasserie and Bar.

References

External links
 

1880 births
1924 deaths
Reynolds family
People from Mount Airy, North Carolina
Philanthropists from North Carolina
Sullins College alumni
20th-century American philanthropists